The 1981–82 Biathlon World Cup was a multi-race tournament over a season of biathlon, organised by the UIPMB (Union Internationale de Pentathlon Moderne et Biathlon). The season started on 14 January 1982 in Egg am Etzel, Switzerland, and ended on 7 March 1982 in Lahti, Finland. It was the fifth season of the Biathlon World Cup, and it was only held for men.

Calendar
Below is the World Cup calendar for the 1981–82 season.

*The relays were technically unofficial races as they did not count towards anything in the World Cup.

World Cup Podium

Men

Standings: Men

Overall 

Final standings after 10 races.

Achievements
First World Cup career victory
, 28, in his 5th season — the WC 1 Individual in Egg am Etzel; first podium was 1977–78 Individual in Sodankylä
, 23, in his 1st season — the WC 2 Individual in Antholz-Anterselva; it also was his first podium
, 21, in his 3rd season — the WC 3 Sprint in Ruhpolding; first podium was 1979–80 Individual in Ruhpolding

First World Cup podium
, 22, in his 1st season — no. 2 in the WC 1 Individual in Egg am Etzel
, in his 1st season — no. 2 in the WC 3 Individual in Ruhpolding
, 24, in his 3rd season — no. 2 in the WC 3 Sprint in Ruhpolding

Victory in this World Cup (all-time number of victories in parentheses)
, 4 (14) first places
, 2 (2) first places
, 1 (3) first place
, 1 (2) first place
, 1 (1) first place
, 1 (1) first place

Retirements
Following notable biathletes retired after the 1981–82 season:

References

Biathlon World Cup
World Cup